Stéphanie Brieussel (born 29 January 1974) is a French Olympic dressage rider. Representing France, she competed at the 2016 Summer Olympics in Rio de Janeiro, where she finished 55th in the individual and 8th in the team competitions.

References

External links
 

Living people
1974 births
French female equestrians
French dressage riders
Equestrians at the 2016 Summer Olympics
Olympic equestrians of France